Timothy Philip Hodgson (born 27 March 1975) is a former English cricketer.  Hodgson was a left-handed batsman.  He was born at Guildford, Surrey, while he was educated at Wellington College and Durham University.

Hodgson made his debut for Essex in a List A match against Gloucestershire in the 1996 AXA Equity and Law League.  From 1996 to 1998, he represented the county in 8 List A matches, the last of which came against Leicestershire in the 1998 AXA League.  While representing Essex, Hodgson was also undertaking further education with Durham University.  It was while studying there that he represented a British Universities team in 5 List A matches in 1997, the last of which came against Hampshire.

Hodgson also represented Essex in first-class cricket, making his debut for the county in that format against Kent in 1997.  From 1997 to 1999, he represented the county in 11 first-class matches, the last of which came against Oxford University.  In those 11 matches, he scored 361 runs at an average of 18.05, with a single half century high score of 54.  In the field he took 4 catches.  With the ball he took  a single wicket a bowling average of 34.00, with best figures of 1/34.

In the 2000 NatWest Trophy, Hodgson made his debut in List A cricket for the Surrey Cricket Board against Shropshire.  He played 2 further List A matches for the Board against Huntingdonshire and Surrey, both in the 2001 Cheltenham & Gloucester Trophy.  In his combined total of 16 List A matches, he scored 376 runs at an average of 25.06, with a single half century and a single century high score of 113.  In the field he took 2 catches.

Family
His brother, James, played first-class cricket for Cambridge University. His great-uncle, Neville Knox, played Test cricket for England as well as first-class cricket for Surrey and the Marylebone Cricket Club.

Tim also has two other brothers, an older brother Mark who resides in Sydney, Australia and is a senior manager for Travelex Global Business Payments, and a younger brother Charles who resides in London.

Hodgson resides in Sydney, Australia with his wife, four children and their dog.

References

External links
Tim Hodgson at Cricinfo
Tim Hodgson at CricketArchive

1975 births
Living people
Sportspeople from Guildford
People from Surrey
People educated at Wellington College, Berkshire
English cricketers
Essex cricketers
Surrey Cricket Board cricketers
British Universities cricketers
Alumni of the College of St Hild and St Bede, Durham